Jesse F. West (July 16, 1862 – October 25, 1929) was born in Sussex County, Virginia.  He was educated in public schools, the Suffolk Collegiate Institute and the University of North Carolina, where he graduated in 1885.  Following his graduation there, he attended the University of Virginia and studied law under Professor John B. Minor. 

He was admitted to the bar in July 1886, and began practice in his home county of Sussex. In 1890, he was elected superintendent of schools, but resigned on January 1, 1892, to accept the offer of judge of the county court.  He was elected by the Virginia General Assembly in 1902, to the position of judge of the Third Judicial Circuit, beginning his term on February 1, 1904. On February 1, 1922, he was elected to the Supreme Court of Appeals and served there until his death at his home in Waverly, Virginia.

Justices of the Supreme Court of Virginia
Virginia lawyers
1862 births
1929 deaths
People from Waverly, Virginia
University of North Carolina alumni
University of Virginia School of Law alumni
20th-century American politicians
19th-century American judges
19th-century American lawyers
Virginia circuit court judges